Fredrik Waldemar Bergroth (14 May 1852, Humppila - 4 October 1928) was a Finnish Lutheran clergyman and politician. He was a member of the Parliament of Finland from 1917 to 1919 and again from 1922 to 1927, representing the Finnish Party until 1918 and the National Coalition Party thereafter.

References

1852 births
1928 deaths
People from Humppila
People from Häme Province (Grand Duchy of Finland)
Finnish Party politicians
National Coalition Party politicians
Members of the Parliament of Finland (1917–19)
Members of the Parliament of Finland (1922–24)
Members of the Parliament of Finland (1924–27)
University of Helsinki alumni
People of the Finnish Civil War (White side)